Collins Jacques Seitz (June 20, 1914 – October 16, 1998) was a United States circuit judge of the United States Court of Appeals for the Third Circuit.

Education and career

Born on June 20, 1914, in Wilmington, Delaware, Seitz received an Artium Baccalaureus degree in 1937 from the University of Delaware and a Bachelor of Laws in 1940 from the University of Virginia School of Law. He entered private practice in Wilmington from 1940 to 1946. He served as a Vice Chancellor of the Delaware Court of Chancery from 1946 to 1951, as a justice of the Delaware Supreme Court from 1949 to 1951, and as the Chancellor of the Delaware Court of Chancery from 1951 to 1966.

Notable Chancery case

During his term as Chancellor, Seitz ruled on the Gebhart v. Belton case, which was later combined with several other cases into the Supreme Court of the United States decision in Brown v. Board of Education.  Seitz determined that segregation was intrinsically discriminatory but that the Supreme Court forbade a ruling on such a basis in Plessy v. Ferguson and Gong Lum v. Rice: "[W]hile State-imposed segregation in lower education provides Negroes with inferior educational opportunities, such inferiority has not yet been recognized by the United States Supreme Court as violating the Fourteenth Amendment. On the contrary, it has been by implication excluded as a Constitutional factor.".  Despite this limitation, Chancellor Seitz ruled that conditions were unequal, and that the only remedy that could suffice was integration.  The Delaware Supreme Court affirmed his ruling.  Thus, when the consolidated Brown litigation came before the Court, Delaware was the lone jurisdiction whose courts had ordered integration, and so was affirmed rather than reversed by the Brown decision.

Federal judicial service

Seitz was nominated by President Lyndon B. Johnson on February 28, 1966, to a seat on the United States Court of Appeals for the Third Circuit vacated by Judge John Biggs Jr. He was confirmed by the United States Senate on June 9, 1966, and received his commission on the same day. He served as Chief Judge from 1971 to 1984. He was a member of the Judicial Conference of the United States from 1971 to 1984. He assumed senior status on June 1, 1989. His service terminated on October 16, 1998, due to his death in Wilmington.

Personal

Seitz's daughter, Virginia A. Seitz, is a well-known attorney, formerly at the Office of Legal Counsel of the United States Department of Justice, and now at Sidley Austin. Seitz's son, Collins J. Seitz Jr., is the chief justice of the Delaware Supreme Court. C.J. Seitz was a founding partner at the Delaware law firm of Seitz Ross Aronstam & Moritz. A brother, John F. R. Seitz, was a career United States Army officer who served as a colonel in World War II and retired at the grade of major general.

References

Sources
 

1914 births
1998 deaths
20th-century American judges
Associate Judges of Delaware
Chancellors of Delaware
Judges of the United States Court of Appeals for the Third Circuit
People from Wilmington, Delaware
United States court of appeals judges appointed by Lyndon B. Johnson
University of Delaware alumni
University of Virginia School of Law alumni
Vice Chancellors of Delaware